Frank Leon Roberts (born August 25, 1982) is an American activist, writer, political commentator, and college professor known for his involvement in the #BlackLivesMatter movement. Roberts is currently a faculty member at New York University's Gallatin School of Individualized Study, where his course "Black Lives Matter: Race, Resistance, and Populist Protest" received national attention for being one of the first such courses offered on a university campus. He has been a frequent media commentator on issues related to the intersections of race and gender in American public life.

A community organizer and public speaker, Roberts's varied perspectives on #BlackLivesMatter's influence on public debates about race and racial inequity have been cited by The New York Times, BBC Radio, NBC, CBC, Univision, The Chronicle of Higher Education and a variety of national outlets.

Roberts is also the founder and executive director of For Freedom's Sake, a New York City based grassroots social justice organization that mobilizes black and brown communities through teach-ins and public dialogues.

Roberts is a current Roddenberry Foundation Fellow. He is also a Ford Foundation Fellow.

Education 
Roberts is an undergraduate alumnus of New York University, where he received both NYU's Michael Parkes Distinguished Alumni Award and Martin Luther King Trailblazer Award in 2015. He also attended graduate school at NYU as a Ford Foundation Doctoral Dissertation Fellow and Yale University.

References

1982 births
Living people
American activists
American male writers
American political commentators
New York University alumni
New York University faculty